The 1992 United Kingdom general election in England was held on 9 April 1992 for 524 English seats to the House of Commons. John Major's Conservative Party won a decisive majority of English seats for the fourth successive election, although the Labour Party made substantial gains. Together with Conservative seats in Scotland and Wales, this gave the Conservatives an overall majority in the House of Commons of 21 seats.

Results table

References

England
1992 in England
General elections in England to the Parliament of the United Kingdom